Cecilia Makiwane Hospital (CMH) is a large, provincial, government-funded hospital situated in the Mdantsane township near East London, Eastern Cape in South Africa. It is a tertiary teaching hospital and forms part of the East London Hospital Complex with Frere Hospital. It is named after Cecilia Makiwane, the first African woman to become a professional nurse in South Africa.

History
Health Minister Chief Mqalo renamed the Mdantsane Hospital to Cecilia Makiwane Hospital in 1977, to commemorate Cecilia Makiwane, the first Black nurse in South Africa. On 30 April 1982, the Department of Posts and Telecommunications of the Republic of Ciskei honored her with a philatelic stamp and a first day cover, detailing her life.

The University of Cape Town honors and commemorates woman heroes of anti-apartheid struggle which includes Cecilia Makiwane. A charcoal portrait of Cecilia Makiwane done by Dr.Amitabh Mitra was exhibited at the Molly Blackburn Hall, University of Cape Town campus on the 19 September 2019.

Departments and services
The hospital's departments include: Trauma and Emergency, Paediatrics, Obstetrics/Gynecology, Surgery, Internal Medicine, ARV clinic for HIV/AIDS in adults and children, Anaesthetics, Paediatric Surgery, Family Medicine, Psychiatry, Dermatology, Otolaryngology (ENT), Ophthalmology and burns unit. The Orthopaedic department runs a weekly clinic.

Other facilities include an operating theatre, Intensive Care Unit (ICU) for adult, paediatric and neonatal patients, and high-care wards for general and obstetric patients. The hospital also offers allied health services such as physiotherapy, occupational therapy, speech and language therapy, psychology, social worker, dentistry and dietetics. Other services include CSSD Services, Pharmacy, Post Trauma Counseling Services, Occupational Services, X-Ray Services with Computed Tomography (CT) facility, National Health Laboratory Service (NHLS), blood bank and mortuary.

New Cecilia Makiwane Hospital
The new Cecilia Makiwane Hospital was officially opened by the Deputy President of South Africa Cyril Ramaphosa on the 17 September 2017.

References

External links
Cecilia Makiwane Hospital
Cecilia Makiwane Hospital, Symbol of Hope and Courage in South Africa, A Photo-Essay by Dr. Amitabh Mitra March 1, 2009

Buffalo City Metropolitan Municipality
Teaching hospitals in South Africa